Ifeanyi George (22 November 1993 – 22 March 2020) was a Nigerian professional footballer who played as a striker.

Career
Born in Umuahia, George played club football for Enyimba and Enugu Rangers.

He earned two caps for Nigeria in 2017.

Death
Ifeanyi was killed in a car accident on 22 March 2020 whilst traveling from Enugu to Lagos following the cancelation of the Nigerian league due to COVID-19. Ifenayi, along with teammate Emmanuel Ogbu and friend Eteka Gabriel, were reported to have crashed into an articulated vehicle. All 3 people in the car died at the scene.

References

1993 births
2020 deaths
Nigerian footballers
Nigeria international footballers
Place of birth missing
Enyimba F.C. players
Rangers International F.C. players
Association football forwards
Road incident deaths in Nigeria
People from Umuahia